Jacks Peak Park is a county park in Monterey County, California. Its central feature is Jacks Peak, the highest point on the Monterey Peninsula, rising 1,068 feet (325 m) above Monterey and Carmel. The park encompasses 525 acres under control of the Monterey County Parks Department.

History
The park is part of the Pueblo Lands tract acquired in 1859 by Scottish immigrant David Jack. The first  that were to become the park were purchased by Talcott and Margaret Pardee Bates in 1964. They sold it to the Nature Conservancy, who eventually sold it to Monterey County.  In 1971, the county purchased the remaining acres for the park from Del Monte Properties. The park opened in January, 1977.

Facilities

The park allows picnics and day hiking. Several miles of trails, including a self-guided nature trail, wrap around Jacks Peak and through the rest of the park.

Environment and Monterey Pines
The park includes one of only three remaining native stands of the Monterey Pine. Flora in the park also includes madrone (arbutus menziesii), coastal scrub (including coyote brush (baccharis pilularis), California sagebrush, black sage, and ceanothus), poison oak, and the coast live oak.

References

External links
 County Parks page for Jacks Peak Park
 Map of Jacks Peak Park

Parks in Monterey County, California
Nature reserves in California
Regional parks in California